Ady Stefanetti (17 November 1942 – 1 October 1995) was a Luxembourgian gymnast. He competed in seven events at the 1964 Summer Olympics.

References

1942 births
1995 deaths
Luxembourgian male artistic gymnasts
Olympic gymnasts of Luxembourg
Gymnasts at the 1964 Summer Olympics
People from Differdange
20th-century Luxembourgian people